Ek Kahani Julie Ki is a Hindi thriller film directed by Aziz Zee and produced by Chetna Sharma under the banner of Chetna Entertainments. The film stars Rakhi Sawant Amit Mehra and Jimmy Sharma in the lead roles. The movie is set in the Indian film industry. The film was released on 9 September 2016.

Cast
 Rakhi Sawant as Julie
 Jimmy Sharma as DK Bhaskar
 Amit Mehra as Nikhil Kapoor
 Saniya Pannu as Mahi Srivastav
 Avadh Sharma as Niketan Kapoor
 Aakriti Nagpal as Neena
 Adi Irani
 Rajesh Khera

Soundtrack
The Music was composed By DJ Sheizwood and Deepak Agrawal composed the song "Fanari" and songs were produced by Zee Music Company.

References

External links
 

2016 films
2010s Hindi-language films